Edwin J. Chilgren (July 4, 1897 – August 31, 1972) was an American newspaper publisher. He served as a member of the Minnesota House of Representatives (1927- 1965) and was Speaker of the Minnesota House of Representatives (1959– 1963).

Chilgren was born in Jämtland, Sweden. He was the son of John Frederick Chilgren (1872–1950) and Brita Kristina (Sjolund) Chilgren (1876–1918). After emigrating from Sweden at the age of seven, he was raised in Blackduck, Minnesota. Chilgren served with the United States Marines during World War I. He was the owner of the Littlefork (MN) Times in Koochiching County which he bought in 1921. He published this newspaper for 43 years, selling it when he retired in 1964.

He was elected to the Minnesota House of Representatives in 1926, where he caucused with the Liberal Caucus in the then-nonpartisan body. He became chair of the taxes committee in 1955, and in 1959 he was elected speaker, a position he held until conservatives took control of the house in 1963. Chilgren retired from the legislature after the 1964 elections.

Personal life
In 1920, he married Flonice Lorene (Williams) Chilgren (1902–1969). They were the parents of two daughters. He died in 1972. Both he and his wife were buried in Oakley Cemetery in Littlefork, Minnesota.

References

External links

 

1897 births
1972 deaths
People from Jämtland
American Lutherans
United States Marine Corps personnel of World War I
Military personnel from Minnesota
Members of the Minnesota House of Representatives
Speakers of the Minnesota House of Representatives
Swedish emigrants to the United States
20th-century American politicians
20th-century American newspaper publishers (people)
20th-century American businesspeople
People from Beltrami County, Minnesota
20th-century Lutherans